John Alexander Ireland Jr. (born July 15, 1957) is an American sportscaster based in Southern California, who is currently the radio play-by-play announcer for the Los Angeles Lakers of the National Basketball Association (NBA).

Early life
Ireland was born in Newport Beach, California to Myrna and John Ireland and was raised in the neighborhood Corona del Mar, Newport Beach.

Radio career

Since 2011, Ireland has been employed as the radio play-by-play announcer for the Los Angeles Lakers. He also hosts (along with Steve Mason) a Monday-Friday sports talk show on KSPN-AM radio, from 12:55pm to 3:55pm.

Previously, Ireland hosted shows at XTRA-AM in San Diego, KLAC-AM in Los Angeles, and nationally on the Fox Sports Radio network.  From 1997-2000, Mason and Ireland hosted a live TV/Radio simulcast on the Fox Sports West cable network. 

Prior to being named the Lakers announcer, he did part-time play-by-play and sideline work for the Los Angeles Clippers, as well as UCLA football and basketball.

Television career

From 1995 through 2012, Ireland was employed as a sports anchor/reporter by KCBS/KCAL-TV, the Viacom-owned duopoly in Los Angeles.  From 2002-2010, he worked as the sideline reporter for all Los Angeles Lakers broadcasts on KCAL-TV.
 
Previously, he worked as a sportscaster at KTVE-TV in Monroe, Louisiana; KBMT-TV in Beaumont, Texas; and KUSI-TV in San Diego, California. In San Diego, he won two Emmy awards for best sportscast.

Education

Ireland is a graduate of Corona del Mar High School, in Newport Beach, California, Class of 1981. In high school, he was a member of the basketball team and wrote for Trident Magazine.
 
He received a bachelor's degree in history from UCLA in 1985, and was the sports director of the campus radio station, KLA-AM. He is a member of the Sigma Chi fraternity.

References

American sports radio personalities
Living people
Los Angeles Lakers announcers
National Basketball Association broadcasters
Place of birth missing (living people)
University of California, Los Angeles alumni
People from Newport Beach, California
1963 births